Elizabeth Parker may refer to:

 Elizabeth Parker (composer), worked at the BBC Radiophonic Workshop
 Elizabeth Parker (journalist) (1856–1944), Canadian journalist and co-founder of the Alpine Club of Canada
 Elizabeth Spencer, Baroness Hunsdon (1552–1618), married name Elizabeth Parker
 Liz Parker, a fictional character and the protagonist of the Roswell High book series and Roswell television series
 Bonnie Elizabeth Parker, see Bonnie and Clyde